Charalampos Papaioannou (born January 4, 1971) is a Greek judoka.

Achievements

References

1971 births
Living people
Greek male judoka
Judoka at the 1996 Summer Olympics
Judoka at the 2004 Summer Olympics
Olympic judoka of Greece
Mediterranean Games bronze medalists for Greece
Mediterranean Games medalists in judo
Competitors at the 1993 Mediterranean Games
20th-century Greek people
21st-century Greek people